The North Carolina secretary of state election of 1940 took place on November 5, 1940. The incumbent Secretary of State, Thad A. Eure, chose to run for reelection and defeated A. I. Ferree with 75.71% of the vote. Eure won his second of thirteen terms.

Results

References 

Secretary of State
North Carolina Secretary of State elections
North Carolina
November 1940 events